Ablepharus lindbergi, Lindberg's snake-eyed skink or Lindberg's twin-striped skink, is a species of lizard in the family Scincidae. It is endemic to Afghanistan.

References

Ablepharus
Reptiles described in 1960
Reptiles of Afghanistan
Endemic fauna of Afghanistan
Taxa named by Otto von Wettstein